In the U.S. state of Louisiana, the typical governing body of the parish is called the Police Jury (French: le Jury de Police). Not every parish is governed by a Police Jury, but 38 of the 64 parishes use this system. The Police Jury is akin to the commissions or councils that govern counties in most other states.

The Police Jury is the legislative and executive body of the parish, and is elected by the voters. Its members are called Jurors, and together they elect a President as their chairman. The President presides over the Police Jury and serves as the titular head of the parish government; he is the equivalent of a county executive or county commission chairman in other states.

Police juries range in size, depending on the population of the parish, from three to fifteen. Many parishes are quite rural and therefore have small police juries. Wide latitude is given to organize and administer the police jury's business.

Like other elections in Louisiana, parish elections typically occur in odd-numbered years, and use the open primary system.

Origins of the Police Jury
When the United States first organized present-day Louisiana as the Territory of Orleans in 1804, the territory was divided into 12 counties. This system proved unsatisfactory, and by 1807, the territory reorganized its civil government roughly according to Catholic parishes in the region.

Each parish had a parish judge and a justice of the peace, both appointed. Voters also elected a police jury, which was responsible for law and order and other administration. The office of sheriff was added in 1810. Louisiana was admitted to the Union in 1812, and kept the parish system. Later on, parishes were divided into wards. The last vestiges of the territorial county system were removed in 1845.

The parish system continued to evolve until the Louisiana Constitution of 1975, which established the modern local government system as Louisianans know it today.

Parishes using the Police Jury system

Other forms of parish government
Twenty-six Louisiana parishes are governed by home rule charters that allow them to pick a different form of government. These include: council-president, council-manager, and consolidated parish/city.

Council-President
Under this system, voters typically elect an executive president and a legislative council separately.

Council-Manager
In this system, the voters elect a parish council, which hires a professional manager to run the day-to-day government.
 Caddo Parish

Consolidated Parish/City
In this system, the parish government has been consolidated with the local city government. Voters typically elect a separate council and executive, with the executive called "mayor" or "mayor-president."

 Orleans Parish & New Orleans
 East Baton Rouge Parish & Baton Rouge
 Lafayette Parish & Lafayette
 Terrebonne Parish & Houma

References

County governing bodies in the United States
 

fr:Paroisses de l'État de Louisiane